Pine Lake is an unincorporated community in Red Deer County in the province of Alberta.

Name
Pine Lake got its name from the adjacent lake, the lake used to be known as Ghost Pine Lake from a native legend.

History
The Pine Lake post office opened in 1895. Telephone lines arrived in 1912. On July 14, 2000, it was hit by the Pine Lake tornado, a killer F3 tornado.

Attractions
Pine Lake is home to a number of campgrounds and cottages, including Salvation Army Pine Lake Camp Whispering Pines G&CC, Leisure Campground and Pelican Bay.

References

Localities in Red Deer County